Alberto Azoy (died September 18, 1952) was a Cuban baseball manager in the Cuban League. He managed several teams, including Habana and Club Fé during his career in the late 19th century and the early 20th century.

External links

Cuban League
Negro league baseball managers
Year of birth missing
1952 deaths